Daseuplexia is a genus of moths of the family Noctuidae. The genus was erected by George Hampson in 1906.

Species
Daseuplexia brevipennata Hreblay, Peregovits & Ronkay, 1999 northern Vietnam
Daseuplexia chloromagna Hreblay & Ronkay, 1998 Nepal
Daseuplexia duplicata Hreblay & Ronkay, 1998 Nepal
Daseuplexia erlangi Benedek, Babics & Saldaitis, 2011
Daseuplexia inexpecta Ronkay, Ronkay, Gyulai & Hacker, 2010
Daseuplexia issekutzi Ronkay, Ronkay, Gyulai & Hacker, 2010
Daseuplexia khami Benedek, Babics & Saldaitis, 2011 Sichuan
Daseuplexia lagenifera (Moore, 1882) Darjeeling
Daseuplexia lageniformis (Hampson, 1894) Sikkim
Daseuplexia majseae Benedek, Babics & Saldaitis, 2013 Sichuan
Daseuplexia marmorata Hreblay & Ronkay, 1998 Nepal
Daseuplexia minshana Benedek, Babics & Saldaitis, 2013 northern Sichuan
Daseuplexia nekrasovi Ronkay, Ronkay, Gyulai & Hacker, 2010
Daseuplexia oroplexina Ronkay, Ronkay, Gyulai & Hacker, 2010
Daseuplexia pittergabori Ronkay, Ronkay, Gyulai & Hacker, 2010
Daseuplexia shangrilai Benedek, Babics & Saldaitis, 2011 Yunnan
Daseuplexia tertia Hreblay & Ronkay, 1999 Nepal
Daseuplexia unicata Ronkay, Ronkay, Gyulai & Hacker, 2010
Daseuplexia viridicincta Hreblay & Ronkay, 1998 Nepal

References

Cuculliinae